Bansberia Municipality is the civic body that governs Bansberia and its surrounding areas (Tribeni) in Chinsurah subdivision of Hooghly district, West Bengal, India.

History
Bansberia Municipality was established in 1869.

Geography

Bansberia Municipality covers an area of 9.072 sq km and has a total population of 103,799 (2011).

In 1981, 32.39% of the total population formed main workers and 67.61% were non-workers in Bansberia Municipality and 57.97% of the total main workers were industrial workers. This may be interpreted as follows: although industrial activities are prominent in the municipal areas of the region, the major portion of the population is commuters and migrants find employment in the area.

Healthcare
Bandel Thermal Power Station Hospital, with 10 beds, and a primary health centre with 5 beds are located in the Bansberia Municipality area.

Elections
In the 2015 municipal elections for Bansberia Municipality Trinamool Congress won 17 seats, CPI (M) 1 seat, Forward Bloc 1 seat, BJP 1 seats and  Independents 2 seats.

In the 2010 municipal elections for Bansberia Municipality Trinamool Congress won 17 seats, CPI (M) 2 seats, Forward Bloc 1 seat and Congress 2 seats.

About the 2010 municipal elections, The Guardian wrote, "Today's municipal elections are unlike any for decades: the Communists, who have held West Bengal's main towns almost without a break since the 1970s, are facing disaster… This time defeat is likely to be definitive and could signal the beginning of the end for the Communist Party of India-Marxist (CPIM)."

In the 2005 municipal elections for Bansberia Municipality, CPI (M) won 14 seats, Forward Bloc 1 seat, Congress 5 seats, Trinamool Congress 1 seat and others 1 seat.

References

 

Municipalities of West Bengal